Daniëlle Overgaag (born 24 March 1973) is a road cyclist from the Netherlands.

Cycling career
As a junior, she won bronze at the World Championships in the women's junior road race. She participated at the 1993 UCI Road World Championships in the Women's team time trial. In 1993 she won the silver medal at the Dutch National Road Race Championships and in 1994 she won the silver medal at the Dutch National Time Trial Championships.

Personal life 
She's married to Reinout Oerlemans, with four children.

References

External links
 profile at dewielersite.net

1973 births
Dutch female cyclists
UCI Road World Championships cyclists for the Netherlands
Living people
People from 's-Gravenzande
Cyclists from South Holland